Trinity Foundation may refer to:

 Trinity Foundation (Dallas) of Dallas, Texas, a non-denominational Christian organization most notable for being a televangelism watchdog group and publisher of The Door magazine
 Trinity Foundation (Unicoi) of Unicoi, Tennessee, a non-denominational Reformed organization headed by John W. Robbins that publishes the writings of Gordon Clark
 Trinity Foundation, an evangelical organization founded by Mark Rutland, now known as Global Servants

See also
 Trinity (disambiguation)